Events from the year 1914 in Russia.

Incumbents
 Monarch – Nicholas II
 Chairman of the Council of Ministers – Vladimir Kokovtsov (until 12 February), Ivan Goremykin (starting 12 February)

Events

8 April–9 May - St. Petersburg 1914 chess tournament
10 May - opening of  
29 June - world's first high-speed long-range flight of a heavy aircraft Ilya Muromets started, on the route Saint Petersburg - Orsha - Kopys - Kiev - Saint Petersburg
28 July - Austria-Hungary declares war on Serbia. World War I begins
29 July - In connection with the difficult international situation, Russia begins mobilization in the areas bordering Austria-Hungary. General mobilization is announced the next day. Emperor Nicholas II of Russia sent a telegram to Germany's Wilhelm II with a proposal to "transfer the Austria/Serbia question to the Hague Conference." Wilhelm did not reply to this telegram.
1 August - German Empire declares war on Russia
6 August - Austria-Hungary declares war on Russia
26–30 August - Battle of Tannenberg: German victory
29 August - Abschwangen massacre
31 August - Emperor Nicholas II renamed St. Petersburg to Petrograd as a response to the rise of anti-German sentiment.
1 November - Russia declares war on Ottoman Turkey
 25 December - Battle of Ardahan begins

Births

 March 16 – Arkady Chernyshev, Russian ice hockey player and coach (d. 1992)
15 June - Yuri Andropov, General Secretary of the CPSU (1982–84), Chairman of the KGB (1967–82)
23 August - Lev Ozerov, translator
 August 28 – Paul, Finnish Orthodox archbishop (d. 1988)
 2 October - Yuri Levitan, radio announcer

Deaths
 January 3 – Nadezhda Rykalova, actress (born 1824)
 8 September - Pyotr Nesterov, pilot and aircraft designer

References

1914 in Russia
Years of the 20th century in the Russian Empire